Grevillea parallelinervis is a species of flowering plant in the family Proteaceae and is endemic to South Australia. It is a spreading shrub with sharply-pointed, linear leaves, and down-turned clusters of red flowers with a green-tipped style.

Description
The edges of the leaves are rolled downwards, obscuring the lower surface, apart from the mid-vein.

Taxonomy
Grevillea parallelinervis was first formally described in 1976 by John Carrick in Contributions from the Herbarium Australiense.

Distribution and habitat
This grevillea is found at the western end the Gawler Range between Yardea Station and Mount Wallaby, where it grows in shallow rocky soils in open shrubland.

See also
 List of Grevillea species

References

parallelinervis
Proteales of Australia
Flora of South Australia
Gawler bioregion
Plants described in 1976